Through the Darkness is a 2022 South Korean television series starring Kim Nam-gil, Jin Seon-kyu and Kim So-jin. It is based on the 2018 non-fiction book of the same title co-written by Korea's first criminal profiler Kwon Il-yong and journalist-turned-author Ko Na-mu, which highlights Kwon's field experiences. It aired from January 14 to March 12, 2022, on SBS TV's Fridays and Saturdays at 22:00 (KST) timeslot.

Synopsis
It is about a criminal profiler who struggles to determine the behavioural patterns of serial killers.

Cast

Main
 Kim Nam-gil as Song Ha-young, profiler of the Criminal Behavior Analysis team at Seoul Metropolitan Police Agency's (SMPA) Scientific Investigation division.
 Lee Chun-moo as young Song Ha-young
 Jin Seon-kyu as Gook Young-soo, leader of the Criminal Behavior Analysis team.
 Kim So-jin as Yoon Tae-goo, team leader of the Mobile Investigation Unit at SMPA.

Supporting

Criminal Behavior Analysis team
 Ryeoun as Jung Woo-joo, the person who provides information and analyzes various incident data. He later joins Ha-young and Young-soo's team.

Mobile Investigation Unit
 Lee Dae-yeon as Baek Jun-sik, head of SMPA's Criminal division.
 Kim Won-hae as Heo Gil-pyo, head of SMPA's Mobile Investigation Unit.
 Jung Soon-won as Nam Il-young, the youngest member of Mobile Investigation Unit who respects and follows Tae-goo unconditionally.

Others
 Gong Sung-ha as Choi Yoon-ji, a journalist from online media Fact Today.
 Kim Hye-ok as Park Young-shin, Ha-young's mother.

Extended
 Go Geon-han as Yang Yong-cheol, a man who claimed to be the "Red Hat" murderer.
 Seo Dong-gap as Kim Bong-sik, the first commander of the squadron.
 Hong Woo-jin as Oh In-tak, a forensic officer in SMPA's forensic team and is a junior of Young-soo.
 Oh Seung-hoon as Jo Kang-moo, a serial killer.
 Oh Hee-joon as Kang Yoo-min
 Han Joon-woo as Goo Young-chun, a psychopathic serial killer. 
 Kim Jung-hee as Nam Ki-tae, a psychopathic serial killer.
 Na Cheol as Woo Ho-seong, a psychotic serial killer.

Special appearances
 Jung Man-sik as Park Dae-woong, crime squad leader. 
 Hwang Jung-min as the key witness of a crime.
 Oh Kyung-ju as Bang Ki-hoon, a suspect who was investigated for killing his own girlfriend.
 Ha Do-kwon as Shin Ki-ho, the director of the online media Fact Today.

Release
It was initially reported that the series was likely to be aired in October 2021. However, it was later confirmed in November that it would premiere on January 14, 2022.

Original soundtrack

Part 1

Part 2

Part 3

Part 4

Viewership

Awards and nominations

Note

References

External links
  
 
 

Korean-language television shows
Seoul Broadcasting System television dramas
Television shows based on South Korean novels
South Korean crime television series
South Korean thriller television series
Television series by Studio S
2022 South Korean television series debuts
2022 South Korean television series endings